Tripterygion tartessicum is a species of fish in the family Tripterygiidae, the threefin blennies. It is widespread in the Mediterranean Sea and eastern Atlantic Ocean, where it occurs along the southern coast of Spain and from Morocco to Tunisia.

The species was described in 2007 when red-black triplefin (Tripterygion tripteronotum) specimens were determined to be individuals of a new species. Its specific name refers to the semi-mythical city of Tartessos and its associated culture, which was located in southern Spain, within the range of this species.

References

tartessicum
Fish of Europe
Fish of Africa
Fish of the Atlantic Ocean
Fish of the Mediterranean Sea
Fish described in 2007